Richard Clark Redman (March 7, 1943 – September 30, 2022) was an American professional football player who was a linebacker with the San Diego Chargers for nine seasons, including five in the American Football League (AFL) and four in the National Football League (NFL). He played college football for the Washington Huskies and was inducted into the College Football Hall of Fame.

Early years
Born in Portland, Oregon on March 7, 1943, Redman attended Bishop Blanchet High School in Seattle, Washington, graduating in the class of 1961. He played right guard and center linebacker under football coach, Mickey Naish. During his junior year, however, he played fullback on offense. He also participated in basketball, track, and wrestling under coach, Bill Herber. Redman earned high school All-American honors in his senior season in 1960.

Redman enrolled at the University of Washington in Seattle and played college football as a guard and linebacker for the Washington Huskies under head coach Jim Owens. He was also the Huskies' punter. In his junior season in 1963, he led the Huskies to a Rose Bowl appearance. Redman was a two time All-American, and Academic All-American once. He was inducted into the Husky Hall of Fame in 1982 and the College Football Hall of Fame in 1995.

Professional career
Redman was selected in the tenth round of the 1965 NFL draft by the Philadelphia Eagles and in the fifth round of the AFL draft by the San Diego Chargers. He signed with the Chargers to play linebacker and played with them for nine seasons, from 1965 to 1973. Redman was an AFL All-Star in 1967. In his first three seasons, he was also the Chargers' punter.

In the World Football League's inaugural 1974 season, he played with the Portland Storm.

Personal life
After his football career, Redman went to work for Sellen Construction, which was owned by his stepfather. He ascended to become the chief executive officer.

Redman and his first wife, Elaine, had three children. He remarried to Jennifer.

Redman died on September 30, 2022.

See also
Other American Football League players

References

External links
 
 World Football League players – Rick Redman

1943 births
2022 deaths
American football linebackers
San Diego Chargers players
Washington Huskies football players
All-American college football players
American Football League All-Star players
College Football Hall of Fame inductees
Players of American football from Portland, Oregon
Players of American football from Seattle
American Football League players
Bishop Blanchet High School alumni